Sovac is an Algerian UCI Continental cycling team founded in 2017. It was originally a club team, but it gained Continental status for the 2018 season. The team was created by former Belgian cyclist Geoffrey Coupé.

Major results
2018
Stages 2 & 4 Tour International des Zibans, Youcef Reguigui
Prologue Grand Prix International de la ville d'Alger, Gaetan Bille
Stage 2 Grand Prix International de la ville d'Alger, Youcef Reguigui
Overall Tour de la Pharmacie Centrale, Gaetan Bille
Stage 1, Youcef Reguigui
Stage 2, Gaetan Bille
Stage 1 Tour d'Algérie, Abderrahmane Mehdi Hamza
Stages 4, 5 & 7 Tour d'Algérie, Youcef Reguigui
Stages 2, 3 & 4 Tour du Sénégal, Youcef Reguigui
Stage 8 Tour du Sénégal, Islam Mansouri
Overall Tour International de la Wilaya d'Oran, Laurent Evrard
Stage 1, Davide Rebellin
Stage 4, Laurent Evrard
2019
Stage 2 Tour of Egypt, Nassim Saidi
Overall Tour du Maroc, Laurent Evrard

Team roster

References

UCI Continental Teams (Africa)
Cycling teams established in 2017
Cycling teams based in Algeria